The Ilagan Japanese Tunnel is a war tunnel that was part of a military base built by the Japanese government as headquarters for its soldiers during World War II. It is found in barangay Santo Tomas in Ilagan City in the province of Isabela. It is one of the few remaining tunnels in the province.  It measures about forty (40) meters in length and a bit over three (3) meters in width and height. The real size of the tunnel, however, has yet to be determined as the site has yet to be fully checked and explored.

References 

Tunnels in the Philippines
Military history of the Philippines during World War II
Isabela
Ilagan